Alisher Yergali (born 12 April 1999) is a Kazakhstani freestyle wrestler. He is a four-time medalist at the Asian Wrestling Championships. He represented Kazakhstan at the 2020 Summer Olympics in Tokyo, Japan.

Career 

He won the bronze medal at the Asian Wrestling Championships, both in 2019 and in 2020.

In 2019, he competed in the men's freestyle 97 kg event at the World Wrestling Championships held in Nur-Sultan, Kazakhstan. He lost his bronze medal match against Magomedgadzhi Nurov of North Macedonia.

In 2021, he won one of the bronze medals in the men's 97 kg event at the Poland Open held in Warsaw, Poland. He competed in the men's freestyle 97 kg event at the 2020 Summer Olympics held in Tokyo, Japan.

In 2022, he competed at the Yasar Dogu Tournament held in Istanbul, Turkey. He won the silver medal in the men's 125kg event at the 2022 Asian Wrestling Championships held in Ulaanbaatar, Mongolia.

Achievements

References

External links 

 

Living people
1999 births
Place of birth missing (living people)
Kazakhstani male sport wrestlers
Asian Wrestling Championships medalists
Wrestlers at the 2020 Summer Olympics
Olympic wrestlers of Kazakhstan
21st-century Kazakhstani people